The University of Zambia School of Medicine (UNZASOM),  also known as University of Zambia Medical School is the school of medicine of the University of Zambia. The medical school is the country's first public medical school, the other being the Copperbelt University School of Medicine. The school provides medical education at undergraduate and postgraduate levels.

Location
The school's campus is located in the neighborhood of Ridgeway in the city of Lusaka, the capital of Zambia and its largest city. It lies in proximity to University Teaching Hospital. The coordinates of the medical campus are: 15°26'06.0"S, 28°18'46.0"E (Latitude:-15.435000; Longitude:28.312778).

Overview
This public medical school was the first to be established in Zambia in 1970. As at 2011, UNZA School of Medicine had graduated approximately 1,200 physicians an surgeons since its inception.

In July 2016, UNZA divided the School of Medicine into four stand-alone schools, namely: (1)  University of Zambia School of Medicine (2)  University of Zambia School of Health Sciences (3)  University of Zambia School of Nursing and (4)  University of Zambia School of Public Health.

Undergraduate courses

Graduate courses
(1) Master of Medicine in Surgery, Obstetrics and Gynaecology, Paediatrics, Internal Medicine and Orthopaedic Surgery. (2)
Master of Science

See also
 Education in Zambia
 List of medical schools in Zambia

References

External links
 University of Zambia School of Medicine Homepage 
 University of Zambia Homepage

University of Zambia
Medical schools in Zambia
Educational institutions established in 1970
1970 establishments in Zambia